The Ferrari 410 S was a sports racing car produced by Ferrari in 1955–1956. After the racing successes of 375 Plus, mainly in 1954 Carrera Panamericana, Ferrari decided to prepare another model for this marathon. The 410 S was intended as a long-distance race car originally designed for the 1955 Carrera Panamericana and was the final model of the Lampredi V12 sports car lineage. The next generation of sports racing cars that replaced the 410 S were powered by the new Jano V12 engines.

Development
The Ferrari 410 S was created as an evolution of the 375 Plus that preceded it. All four serial numbers bear "CM" suffix standing for "Carrera Messicana" of their intended, but never realised, race. The Mexican marathon was cancelled for 1955 edition, mainly due to the Le Mans disaster.

Specifications

Engine and transmission
A familiar long-block 5.0 L Lampredi V12 with a different internal measurements was used. This same basic Type 126 single plug engine powered the 410 Superamerica road car. Out of four cars only two factory race cars received the uprated Type 126/C competition engine. An additional spark plugs were located outside of the cylinder banks and were accessible by a trapdoors in the bodywork. This was the only Lampredi V12 with a twin plug arrangement and also the highest in output. A double ignition was designed for harsh conditions of the five-day Mexican race. The top speed was 280-303 kmh, depending on the version. All cars used dry sump lubrication, triple-plate clutch and a 5-speed manual gearbox mounted at the rear of a transaxle type.

Chassis and suspension
The chassis was made of an elliptical section steel tubes. The front suspension was independent with an unequal-length wishbones. The rear had De Dion axle and transverse leaf springs, already introduced on racing Ferraris a couple years back. Brakes were drum-type all round. The fuel tank could accommodate 195 litres of fuel.

Speciale

A one-off Berlinetta Speciale by Carrozzeria Scaglietti, s/n 0594CM, was also created. It was a special order from Michel Paul-Cavallier, an industrialist and a former SEFAC director. The body design loosely resembled Pinin Farina-designed berlinettas but had to be transferred to a shorter chassis with a wider track. The engine was of a single plug type and used three Weber 42DCF/3 carburettors. The car was based on a race car type 519C chassis, completed by July 1955 and delivered with ivory paintwork with blue leather interior to its first owner. The same as the race cars it was also right-hand drive.

Racing

The 410 S' first outing was 1956 1000km of Buenos Aires, driven by Juan Manuel Fangio and Eugenio Castellotti. Although two cars entered and neither finished, they achieved an impressive top speed of 303 kmh and set a new lap record. This was the only race in which the 410 S was entered as a works car. Caroll Shelby raced one of those cars in United States with many victories in 1956: in Palm Springs, National Seafair, National Palm Springs, Governor's Trophy and New Smyrna Beach amongst them.

Phil Hill and Richie Ginther also raced in the US, the latter winning the 1957 Riverside race. Cars had common problems with rear axles or transmissions that could not endure the immense power. In 1957 Cuban Grand Prix, among many entered Ferraris, the 410 S was able to achieve second place, driven by Caroll Shelby. The car was entered by John Edgar. Same feat was repeated in 1958 edition of the Havana Grand Prix, this time Masten Gregory was behind the wheel.

Collectability
The Ferrari 410 S is highly collectable due to its extremely low production values and very high performance. In 2012, Berlinetta Speciale s/n 0594CM was sold on RM Sotheby's auction in Monterey for US$8.25 million. In 2014 s/n 0592CM was sold on Rick Cole Auctions for US$23 million. This was the car with shorter wheelbase and single plug engine.

References

Bibliography

External links

410 S
Sports racing cars